A peanut gallery was, in the days of vaudeville, a nickname for the cheapest and ostensibly rowdiest seats in the theater, the occupants of which were often known to heckle the performers. The least expensive snack served at the theatre would often be peanuts, which the patrons would sometimes throw at the performers on stage to convey their disapproval.  Phrases such as "no comments from the peanut gallery" or "quiet in the peanut gallery" are extensions of the name.

Background 
According to Stuart Berg Flexner, the term owes its origin to the United States' segregated South as a synonym with the back seats or upper balcony mostly reserved for Black people.

In popular culture
In 1943 the Howdy Doody children's radio show adopted the name for its live audience of children. Howdy Doody is most remembered for its later transition to television, which continued the Peanut Gallery audience, then on camera.

"Peanut gallery" may have been the source of the name for Charles Schulz's comic strip, Peanuts: a name Schulz bitterly resented and never understood. Schulz had wanted to keep the name of his previous strip, Li'l Folks.  However, United Features Syndicate pointed out that that name was too similar to other strips such as Li'l Abner.  Thus, Peanuts was chosen.

A similar term was introduced to Brazilian football by coach Luiz Felipe Scolari. He called Palmeiras' complaining audience that sat in the closest seats  "peanut gang".

C. J. Dennis's poem "The Play" from Songs of a Sentimental Bloke, recapitulating  the suicide scene from Romeo and Juliet, ends bathetically with "Peanuts or lollies!" sez a boy upstairs."

See also
 Bleacher
 Groundling
 Heckler
 Nosebleed section
 Statler and Waldorf
 The gods (theatrical)
 Tricoteuse

References

External links

Theatre
American English idioms